The Possession Islands are a group of small islands and rocks extending over an area of about , lying in the western part of the Ross Sea, lying  south-east of Cape McCormick and  east of Cape Roget, in Victoria Land, Antarctica. The Possession Islands were named by Captain James Clark Ross, Royal Navy, in commemoration of the planting of the British flag here on January 12, 1841.

Possession Island
Archer Peak is a mountain on the southernmost edge of the island.

Important Bird Area
A  site comprising the whole island has been designated an Important Bird Area (IBA) by BirdLife International because it supports about 111,000 breeding pairs of Adélie penguins, based on ground counts made from 1981 to 2012. A significant south polar skua colony is also present on the island.

See also
 Composite Antarctic Gazetteer
 List of Antarctic and Subantarctic islands
 List of Antarctic islands south of 60° S
 SCAR
 Territorial claims in Antarctica

References

External links
 

Important Bird Areas of Antarctica
Penguin colonies
Seabird colonies
Islands of Victoria Land
Borchgrevink Coast